One Hundred and One Nights is a book of Arab literature consisting of twenty stories, which presents many similarities to the more famous One Thousand and One Nights.

The origin of the work is a mystery. Although some suggest the possibility that the stories have their origin in Persia or India, they come from Maghreb (Northwestern Africa), which in turn, according to other authors, were originated in al-Andalus (Islamic Iberia). The book emerged in the West in 1911, when the French Arabist Maurice Gaudefroy-Demombynes  published his French translation of four maghrebi manuscripts. In 2010, the orientalist Claudia Ott discovered the oldest known manuscript, dated from 1234 or 1235, which includes only the first 85 nights. A translation of that manuscript into German was published in 2012,
and into English - in 2016.

The themes and narrative structure are very similar to those of the One Thousand and One Nights — having as setting the immense Muslim world, the stories talk about intrepid travellers, epic and romantic adventures, and enigmas, desires and wonders, which enchant the reader. Besides the other similarities to the One Thousand and One Nights, One Hundred and One Nights has the same heroine — Scheherazade — but it is thought to be older. With the exception of the tales of "The Ebony Horse” and the “Seven Viziers”, also present in “One Thousand and One Nights”, the stories are different in the two works. However, the spirit of both is the same and the scholars consider that the reading of each one of them complements the other and allows a more complete appreciation of mediaeval Arabian literature. According to Claudia Ott, while One Thousand and One Nights talks about the Eastern Arab world, One Hundred and One Nights takes place in the Western Arab world.

References

Medieval Arabic literature
Maghreb
Culture of Al-Andalus